Edward David Kleinbard (November 6, 1951 – June 28, 2020) was an American lawyer, tax academic, and Ivadelle and Theodore Johnson Professor of Law and Business at USC Gould School of Law. Born in Manhattan, he died of cancer in 2020 at Los Angeles.

See also
Double Irish, Single Malt, and CAIA, BEPS tools
Ireland as a tax haven

References

External links

1951 births
2020 deaths
USC Gould School of Law faculty
Lawyers from Los Angeles
Lawyers from New York City
Deaths from cancer in California